Oh, What a Boy! (Swedish: Åh, en så'n grabb) is a 1939 Swedish musical comedy film directed by Ivar Johansson and starring Elof Ahrle, Sickan Carlsson and Gösta Cederlund. It was shot at the Råsunda Studios in Stockholm and on location in the city. The film's sets were designed by the art director Arne Åkermark.

Cast
 Elof Ahrle as 	Loffe Larsson
 Sickan Carlsson as 	Eva Blomberg 
 Gösta Cederlund as 	Axel Blomberg
 Elsa Carlsson as 	Mrs. Blomberg 
 Åke Engfeldt as 	Kurt 'Kurre' Lindberg
 Eivor Landström as Marianne Blomberg
 Erik Berglund as 	Bengtsson 
 Allan Bohlin as 	Gunnar Lundgren
 Willy Peters as Carl-Bertil Blomberg
 Margit Agrell as Greta, Carl-Bertil's date 
 Artur Cederborgh as 	Garage owner 
 Eric Laurent as Constable Eriksson

References

Bibliography 
 Qvist, Per Olov & von Bagh, Peter. Guide to the Cinema of Sweden and Finland. Greenwood Publishing Group, 2000.

External links 
 

1939 films
Swedish comedy films
1939 comedy films
1930s Swedish-language films
Films directed by Ivar Johansson
Swedish black-and-white films
1930s Swedish films